"You Got Me" is a song by American hip hop band the Roots, featuring vocals from Erykah Badu (who sings the chorus) and Eve, then known as Eve of Destruction, who raps the second verse but does not appear in the music video. The track was released as a single from the band's fourth studio album, Things Fall Apart (1999), in January 1999.

Background
"You Got Me" was co-written by musician Jill Scott, who recorded vocals for the song's chorus and bridge. Her part was subsequently re-recorded by Badu at the insistence of MCA Records, who wanted a higher-profile collaboration for the album's official lead single (at the time, Scott was relatively unknown outside Philadelphia). When the group later went on tour, Scott joined them during performances of the song. The original version was later released on the 2005 compilation Home Grown! The Beginners Guide to Understanding the Roots, Volume One.

The song garnered the Roots and Badu a Grammy Award for Best Rap Performance by a Duo or Group in 2000.

Music video
The music video for "You Got Me" was directed by Charles Stone III and features cameos from rapper and actor Common, plus Tracy Morgan as a rider on the bus.

Track listing
European maxi-CD single
 "You Got Me"
 "Adrenaline!"
 "New Year's @ Jay Dee's"
 "You Got Me" (Me Tienes Remix)

Charts

Weekly charts

Year-end charts

Release history

References

External links
 

1998 songs
1999 singles
Erykah Badu songs
Eve (rapper) songs
MCA Records singles
The Roots songs
Songs written by Jill Scott (singer)
Songs written by Scott Storch